Hoogeloon is a Dutch village in the commune of Bladel, in North Brabant.

History 
Close to the village of Hoogeloon there are many tumulus dating from the Bronze Age, and among the largest in Benelux. To the east of the town are the remains of a Roman villa.

Hoogeloon used to be the capital of the municipality of Hoogeloon, Hapert en Casteren. In 1997, it merged into Bladel.

The spoken language is Kempenlands (an East Brabantian dialect, which is very similar to colloquial Dutch).

An Ancient Roman mixing tap has been found at Hoogeloon.

Gallery

References 

Populated places in North Brabant
Bladel